This is a list of tablets produced by Samsung.

Samsung announced its first tablet, the Android-powered Galaxy Tab 7.0, in September 2010. Since then, it has produced a number of tablets, including the Galaxy Tab series, the Galaxy Book series, and the Galaxy View series. It has also released three tablets under the Galaxy Note moniker, a brand that was also used for releasing a number of smartphones. Samsung has also released a number of co-branded tablets, such as the Nexus 10 (with Google) and a number of Nook-branded Galaxy tablets with Barnes & Noble.

Mainstream Android tablets

Flagship tablets 
 Samsung Galaxy Tab 7.0
 Samsung Galaxy Tab 7.0 Plus
 Samsung Galaxy Tab 7.7
 Samsung Galaxy Tab 8.9
 Samsung Galaxy Tab 10.1
 Samsung Galaxy Tab 2 7.0
 Samsung Galaxy Tab 2 10.1
 Samsung Galaxy Tab 3 7.0 
 Samsung Galaxy Tab 3 8.0 
 Samsung Galaxy Tab 3 10.1
 Samsung Galaxy Tab 4 7.0
 Samsung Galaxy Tab 4 8.0
 Samsung Galaxy Tab 4 10.1
 Samsung Galaxy Note 8.0
 Samsung Galaxy Note 10.1
 Samsung Galaxy Note 10.1 2014 Edition
 Samsung Galaxy Note Pro 12.2
 Samsung Galaxy Tab Pro 8.4
 Samsung Galaxy Tab Pro 10.1
 Samsung Galaxy Tab Pro 12.2
 Samsung Galaxy Tab S 8.4
 Samsung Galaxy Tab S 10.5
 Samsung Galaxy Tab S2 8.0
 Samsung Galaxy Tab S2 9.7
 Samsung Galaxy Tab S3
 Samsung Galaxy Tab S4
 Samsung Galaxy Tab S5e
 Samsung Galaxy Tab S6
 Samsung Galaxy Tab S6 Lite
 Samsung Galaxy Tab S7
 Samsung Galaxy Tab S7+
 Samsung Galaxy Tab S7 FE
 Samsung Galaxy Tab S8
 Samsung Galaxy Tab S8+
 Samsung Galaxy Tab S8 Ultra

Entry-level tablets 
 Samsung Galaxy Tab 3 Lite 7.0
 Samsung Galaxy Tab E 8.4
 Samsung Galaxy Tab E 10.5
 Samsung Galaxy Tab E 9.6 (T560, T561)
 Samsung Galaxy Tab E 8.0 (T375, T377)
 Samsung Galaxy Tab A 8.0 (2015)
 Samsung Galaxy Tab A 10.1 (2016)
 Samsung Galaxy Tab A 8.0 (2017)
 Samsung Galaxy Tab A 8.0 (2018)
 Samsung Galaxy Tab A 10.5 (2018)
 Samsung Galaxy Tab A 10.1 (2019)
 Samsung Galaxy Tab A 8.0 (2019)
 Samsung Galaxy Tab A 8.0  (2019) Kids
 Samsung Galaxy Tab A 8.4 (2020)
 Samsung Galaxy Tab A7 10.4 (2020)
 Samsung Galaxy Tab A7 Lite (2021)
 Samsung Galaxy Tab A8 (2022)

Extra-large tablets 
Samsung announced the original Galaxy View, an 18.4-inch tablet, in October 2015. It was succeeded by the slightly smaller, 17.3-inch, Galaxy View 2 in April 2019.

Windows tablets

Co-branded tablets 

 Nexus 10
 Samsung Galaxy Tab 4 Nook
 Samsung Galaxy Tab S2 Nook
 Samsung Galaxy Tab E Nook

See also 
 List of Android smartphones
 List of iPad models

References 

Samsung products
Smart devices